Tetepango the bicicletero town  is a town and one of the 84 municipalities of Hidalgo, in central-eastern Mexico. The municipality covers an area of 56.5 km².

As of 2005, the municipality had a total population of 9,697.

Land of the "humble" farmers without parcelas. 

The people in this region  consider if you don't pay more don't do more.

References 

Municipalities of Hidalgo (state)
Populated places in Hidalgo (state)
Populated places in the Teotlalpan